Quentin Robert Duthie Skinner  (born 26 November 1940) is a British intellectual historian. He is regarded as one of the founders of the Cambridge School of the history of political thought. He has won numerous prizes for his work, including the Wolfson History Prize in 1979 and the Balzan Prize in 2006. Between 1996 and 2008 he was Regius Professor of History at the University of Cambridge. He is the Emeritus Professor of the Humanities and Co-director of The Centre for the Study of the History of Political Thought at Queen Mary University of London.

Biography
Quentin Skinner was born on 26 November 1940, the second son of Alexander Skinner (died 1979) and Winifred Skinner, née Duthie (died 1982). He was educated at Bedford School from the age of seven. Like his elder brother, he won an entrance scholarship to Gonville and Caius College, Cambridge, from where he graduated with a double-starred first in history in 1962. Skinner was elected to a fellowship of his college on his examination results, but moved later in 1962 to a teaching fellowship at Christ's College, Cambridge, where he remained until moving to the University of London in 2008. He is now an Honorary Fellow of both Christ's College and Gonville and Caius College.

Skinner was appointed to a lectureship in the Faculty of History at the University of Cambridge in 1965. He spent a sabbatical year at the Institute for Advanced Study in Princeton in 1974–1975, where he was invited to stay, and where he remained until 1979, when he returned to Cambridge as Professor of Political Science. He was appointed to the post of Regius Professor of History in 1996, and in 1999 as pro-vice-chancellor of the university.

In 1979 he married Susan James, Professor of Philosophy at Birkbeck College London. They have a daughter and a son, and four grandchildren. He was previously married to Patricia Law Skinner, who was later married to the philosopher Bernard Williams.

Skinner has held a number of visiting appointments.  He has been Visiting Fellow at the Research School of Social Science at the Australian National University (1970, 1994, 2006); Visiting Professor at Washington University in St. Louis (1982); Directeur d’Etudes Associé at the Ecole des Hautes Etudes (1987); Professeur Associé at Université Paris X (1991); Visiting Professor at the University of Leuven (1992); Visiting Professor at Northwestern University (1995, 2011); Professeur invité at the Collège de France (1997); Fellow at the Wissenschaftskolleg zu Berlin (2003–04); Visiting Scholar at the Center for European Studies at Harvard University (2008); Laurence Rockefeller Visiting Professor at Princeton University (2013–14); Spinoza Visiting Professor at the University of Amsterdam (2014); Visiting Professor in the Global Fellowship programme at Peking University, Beijing (2017); and Visiting Professor at the University of Chicago (2017).

Skinner has delivered a number of named lecture series, including the Gauss Seminars at Princeton (1980), The Carlyle Lectures at Oxford (1980), The Messenger Lectures at Cornell (1983), The Tanner Lectures at Harvard (1984), the Ford Lectures at Oxford (2003), the Clarendon Lectures at Oxford (2011), the Clark Lectures at Cambridge (2012) and the Academia Sinica Lectures in Taiwan (2013).

Skinner has been a Fellow of the British Academy since 1981, and is also a foreign member of a number of national academies, including the American Academy of Arts and Sciences (1986), the Academia Europaea (1989), the American Philosophical Society (1997), the Royal Irish Academy (1999), the Accademia Nazionale dei Lincei (2007), the Österreichische Academie der Wissenschaften (2009), and the Royal Danish Academy (2015). He has been the recipient of Honorary Degrees from the University of Aberdeen, University of Athens, University of Chicago, University of Copenhagen, University of East Anglia, Harvard University, University of Helsinki, Katholieke Universiteit Leuven, University of Kent, University of Oslo, University of Oxford, Adolfo Ibáñez University (Santiago), University of St Andrews and Uppsala University. From 2009 until 2020, he was a member of the Balzan Prize Committee.

Academia

Methodology 
Skinner is regarded as one of the founders of the 'Cambridge School' of the history of political thought, best known for its attention to what J. G. A. Pocock has described as the 'languages' in which moral and political philosophy has been written. Skinner's contribution has been to articulate a theory of interpretation in which leading texts in the history of political theory are treated essentially as interventions in on-going political debates, and in which the main focus is on what individual writers may be said to have been doing in what they wrote.

This emphasis on political writing as a form of action derives from developments in ordinary language philosophy made by Ludwig Wittgenstein and J. L. Austin. Wittgenstein’s insight was (in Skinner’s words) "that we should stop asking about the ‘meanings’ of words and focus instead on the various functions they are capable of performing in different language games". Skinner takes Austin to have extended Wittgenstein’s argument in isolating the concept of a speech act, described by Skinner as the notion that "whenever we use language for purposes of communication, we are always doing something as well as saying something". According to Skinner, this means that any analysis that restricts itself to merely studying what a past thinker said on a given issue is incomplete. Historians must also recover what a thinker hoped to achieve in saying it. 
 
Skinner consequently proposes a form of linguistic contextualization that involves situating a text in relation to other texts and discourses. In this perspective, the text is a response to other thinkers, texts or cultural discourses. Skinner believes that ideas, arguments and texts should be placed in their original context. One consequence of this view is an emphasis on the necessity of studying less well-known political writers as a means of shedding light on the contemporary debates these classic texts contributed to. In this way, it becomes possible to decipher the original purpose of a text. To Skinner, then, texts are seen as weapons or tools that can, for example, be used to support, discredit, or legitimize specific social and political arrangements. In its earlier versions this added up to a critique of the approach of an older generation, and particularly of Leo Strauss and his followers.

Empirical focus 
Skinner's historical work has mainly focused on political thinking in early-modern Europe. He has written a book on Niccolò Machiavelli, three books on Thomas Hobbes, and his Foundations of Modern Political Thought covers the whole period. He has specifically been concerned with the emergence of modern theories about the nature of the state, and with debates about the nature of political liberty.

Miscellany

When Skinner was interviewed by Alan Macfarlane, as part of his series of online conversations with academics, Skinner admitted that he had been a member of the Cambridge Apostles, a secret debating society in Cambridge University.  He also revealed that Amartya Sen was a member at the same time. Sen mentioned their membership of the Apostles in his memoir Home in the World. He commented that they had both been "outed" in a book published about the Apostles some time before.

On 6 October 1995, Skinner's Foundations of Modern Political Thought was included in the list published by The Times Literary Supplement of 'The 100 Most Influential Books since World War II'.

On 14 May 2009, Times Higher Education, in an article about Skinner's move from Cambridge to the University of London, spoke of Skinner's republicanism, reporting that this led him to refuse a knighthood he was offered when he became Regius Professor of History at Cambridge.

The Balzan-Skinner Lectureship, renamed the "Quentin Skinner Fellowship in Intellectual History since 1500", was established in 2009 at the University of Cambridge. The Quentin Skinner fellow holds a visiting fellowship at the Centre for Research in the Arts, Social Sciences and Humanities for one term of the academic year, which culminates in the Quentin Skinner Lecture and an associated symposium.

Principal publications

Books
1. The Foundations of Modern Political Thought: Volume I: The Renaissance, Cambridge University Press, 1978.  (Translated into Arabic, Chinese, French, Greek, Italian, Korean, Japanese, Persian, Portuguese, Russian, Spanish, Turkish.)

2. The Foundations of Modern Political Thought: Volume II: The Age of Reformation, Cambridge University Press, 1978. 
(Translated into Arabic, Chinese, French, Greek, Italian, Japanese, Persian, Portuguese, Russian, Spanish.)

3(a). Machiavelli, Oxford University Press, 1981.

3(b). Machiavelli: A Very Short Introduction [A revised version of 3(a)], Oxford University Press, 2000.  (Translated into Albanian, Arabic, Chinese, Czech, French, German, Greek, Hebrew, Hungarian, Indonesian, Italian, Japanese, Korean, Kurdish, Malay, Polish, Persian, Portuguese, Romanian, Russian, Spanish, Swedish, Turkish.)

3(c). Machiavelli: A Very Short Introduction [a new and updated edition of 3(b)], Oxford University Press, 2019. 

4. Reason and Rhetoric in the Philosophy of Hobbes, Cambridge University Press, 1996.  (Translated into Chinese, Italian, Portuguese.)

5. Liberty before Liberalism, Cambridge University Press, 1998.  (Translated into Chinese, French, Greek, Italian, Korean, Persian, Polish, Portuguese, Russian, Spanish.)

6. Visions of Politics: Volume I: Regarding Method, Cambridge University Press, 2002.  (Translated into Chinese, French, Italian, Korean, Persian, Polish, Portuguese, Spanish.)

7. Visions of Politics: Volume II: Renaissance Virtues (with 12 colour plates), Cambridge University Press, 2002.  (Translated into Italian.)

8. Visions of Politics: Volume III: Hobbes and Civil Science, Cambridge University Press, 2002. 

9. L’artiste en philosophie politique (with 8 colour plates), Editions de Seuil, Paris, 2003. 

10. Hobbes and Republican Liberty (with 19 illustrations), Cambridge University Press, 2008.  (Translated into Chinese, French, German, Portuguese, Spanish.)

11. La verité et l’historien, ed. Christopher Hamel, Editions EHESS, Paris, 2011. 

12. Die drei Körper des Staates, Wallstein, Göttingen, 2012. 

13. Forensic Shakespeare, Oxford University Press, 2014. 

14. From Humanism to Hobbes: Studies in Rhetoric and Politics (with 45 illustrations), Cambridge University Press, 2018.

References

Further reading

External links

 Queen Mary University of London School of History: Distinguished Visiting Professor in the Humanities Professor Quentin Skinner - official page
 Quentin Skinner, "Belief, Truth, and Interpretation" A lecture delivered at a conference at the Ruhr-University Bochum on 18 November 2014.
 "The Paradoxes of Political Liberty", The Tanner Lectures on Human Values, Harvard University, 1984
 Philosophy Bites podcast of Quentin Skinner on Hobbes on the State
 Philosophy Bites podcast of Quentin Skinner on Machiavelli's The Prince
 'Three Concepts of Liberty' Video recorded at the Einstein Forum, Potsdam, Germany. 
 Interviewed by Alan Macfarlane 10 January 2008 (video)
 Sins of a Historian. An academic discussion on the problem of anachronism including a large exposition of Skinner's methodological views by Sami Syrjämäki.
 "Quest for Freedom – A Conversation with Quentin Skinner", Ideas Roadshow, 2014

1940 births
Academics of Queen Mary University of London
Alumni of Gonville and Caius College, Cambridge
English atheists
English historians
English political philosophers
English republicans
Historians of political thought
Fellows of Christ's College, Cambridge
Fellows of Gonville and Caius College, Cambridge
Fellows of the British Academy
Fellows of the Royal Historical Society
Hobbes scholars
Living people
Members of the University of Cambridge faculty of history
People educated at Bedford School
People from Oldham
Regius Professors of History (Cambridge)